Annika Mehlhorn (born 5 August 1983) is a butterfly and medley swimmer from Germany. She competed at the 2004 Summer Olympics in the 200 m butterfly, but failed to reach the final. She became European champion in the 200 m butterfly at the European Short Course Swimming Championships 2000 in Valencia. At the same event Mehlhorn won the silver medal at the 2001 World Aquatics Championships in Fukuoka, Japan.

See also
 German records in swimming

References

External links
 
 
 

1983 births
Living people
Sportspeople from Kassel
German female swimmers
Olympic swimmers of Germany
German female butterfly swimmers
German female medley swimmers
Swimmers at the 2004 Summer Olympics
World Aquatics Championships medalists in swimming
European Aquatics Championships medalists in swimming
Universiade medalists in swimming
North Hesse
Universiade gold medalists for Germany
Medalists at the 2009 Summer Universiade